This is a comprehensive list of major music awards received by Agnes, a Swedish recording artist who rose to fame as the winner of Idol 2005 and have since then released two studio albums in Sweden and one worldwide. When releasing her third album, Dance Love Pop, worldwide she has gained major success and has been nominated sixteen times for different awards in, among others, Sweden, France and the U.S.

Grammis
The Grammis Awards are the Swedish equivalent of the Grammy Awards. The awards ceremony is generally held each year in February in Stockholm. Agnes has received eight nominations.

|-
| 2006 || "Right Here, Right Now" || Song of the Year || 
|-
|rowspan="2"| 2009 || Herself || Female singer of the Year|| 
|-
| Herself || Singer of the Year|| 
|-
| 2010 || "Release Me" || Song of the Year || 
|-
|rowspan="4"| 2022 ||rowspan="2"| "Magic Still Exists" || Best Album || 
|-
| Best Pop || 
|-
| Agnes Carlsson, Vincent Pontare, Salem Al Fakir, Kerstin Ljungström, Maria Hazell || Best Songwriter|| 
|-
| "24 Hours" || Best Music Video||

MTV Europe Music Awards
The MTV Europe Music Awards is an annual awards ceremony established in 1994 by MTV Networks Europe. Agnes has received one award from two nominations.

|-
|rowspan="2"| 2009 || Herself || Best Swedish Act || 
|-
| Herself || Best European Act||

Swedish Nickelodeon Kids' Choice Awards
Agnes has received one award from one nomination.

|-
| 2006 || Herself || Artist of the Year ||

The QX Awards
The QX Awards is an annual Swedish awards ceremony for Gay and Lesbians. Agnes has received one award from three nominations.

|-
|rowspan="2"| 2009 || Herself || Artist of the Year || 
|-
| "On and On" || Song of the Year|| 
|-
| 2010 || Herself || Artist of the Year||

The Swedish Music Publishers Association Awards
The Swedish Music Publishers Association Awards (Swedish: Musikförläggarnas Pris) has been held since 2003. by Agnes has received one award from one nomination.

 
|-
| 2009 || "Release Me" || Song of the Year ||

P3 Guld
The P3 Guld award is an annually award held by Sveriges Radio. Agnes has received one award from one nomination.

|-
| 2009 || "Release Me" || Song of the Year ||

Radio Regenbogen Awards
The Radio Regenbogen Awards is a German radio award show held annually. Agnes has received one award from one nomination.

|-
| 2010 || Herself || Newcomer of the Year ||

Rockbjörnen Awards
The Rockbjörnen Awards is a Swedish award show held annually by the tabloid Aftonbladet. Agnes has received one nomination.

|-
| 2010 || Herself || Female artist of the year ||

NRJ Music Awards
The NRJ Music Awards was created in 2000 by the radio station NRJ in partnership with the television network TF1 takes place every year in mid-January at Cannes (PACA, France) as the opening of MIDEM (Marché international de l'édition musicale). Agnes has received one nomination.

|-
| 2010 || Herself || International New Artist of the Year ||

NewNowNext Awards
The NewNowNext Awards were held in 2008 by the gay and lesbian-themed network Logo. Agnes has received one award from one nomination.

|-
| 2010 || Herself || Brink of Fame: Music Artist  ||

References

External links
 Official website
  U.S. website
 Official German website

Agnes
Awards